KIOCL Limited, formerly Kudremukh Iron Ore Company Limited is a central public sector undertaking under the ownership of Ministry of Steel, Government of India with its head office and administrative activities in Bangalore. It has a pelletisation plant in Mangalore and had an iron ore mine in Kudremukh (Chikkamagaluru district). It is under the ownership of Ministry of Steel , Government of India. The Kudremukh mine, one of the largest iron ore mines in the world, was closed in 2006.

The captive mining took place at Kudremukh on the Western Ghats range. The mined ore was transported 110 km through slurry pipelines running through the districts of Udupi and Dakshina Kannada up to the pelletisation plant in Panambur, adjacent to the premises of the New Mangalore Port.

The pellet plant with a capacity of 3.5 million tons per annum was commissioned at Mangalore in 1987. The plant was stopped in 2011 but in 2014 the plant resumed producing and exporting pellets, running on ores supplied by NMDC Limited. The pellets have been shipped to countries like China, Iran, Japan, and Taiwan.

In 2017 there were plans to restart captive mining operations, now at Sanduru in Bellary district.

Controversies 
The mining lease was given to KIOCL in Kudremukh for a period of 25 years and was supposed to be closed by December 2001. Kudremukh area is a biodiversity hotspot, with Kudremukh national park nearby. The mining lease was temporarily extended, however, it was completely stopped in 2006 due to environmental reasons.

In 2016 KIOCL planned to develop a commercial resort in the Kudremukh national park, refurbishing some of its buildings, unused since the closure of the mine. The project had not obtained an environmental clearance. In October 2016 the Ministry of Environment and Forests ordered to immediately stop the work.

References

General references 
 Company overview KIOCL Limited.
 Brief overview of KIOCL limited Ministry of Steel, Government of India.

Iron ore mining companies of India
Companies based in Mangalore
Non-renewable resource companies established in 1976
Indian companies established in 1976
Mining in Karnataka
1976 establishments in Karnataka
Companies listed on the National Stock Exchange of India
Companies listed on the Bombay Stock Exchange